The Canton Public School District is a public school district based in Canton, Mississippi (USA).

In addition to Canton it serves a part of Gluckstadt.

Schools
Canton High School
Nichols Middle School
Canton Elementary School 
McNeal Elementary School
Canton School of Arts and Sciences
Canton Public Alternative School

Demographics

2006-07 school year
There were a total of 3,325 students enrolled in the Canton Public School District during the 2006–2007 school year. The gender makeup of the district was 50% female and 50% male. The racial makeup of the district was 98.71% African American, 0.78% Hispanic, 0.39% White, and 0.09% Asian. 89.7% of the district's students were eligible to receive free lunch.

Previous school years

Accountability statistics

See also
List of school districts in Mississippi

References

External links
 

Education in Madison County, Mississippi
School districts in Mississippi
School districts in the Jackson metropolitan area, Mississippi